Jean-Baptiste Gonnet (born 28 September 1982) is a French professional golfer.

Gonnet was born in Cannes. He turned professional in 2004 and played on the  Challenge Tour from 2004 to 2006. He finished 17th in the 2006 Order of Merit to earn a place on the European Tour for 2007. He competed on the European Tour until 2013. His best season was his debut year in 2007, when he finished 90th in the Order of Merit. He also recorded his best tournament result to date in 2007, finishing tied for second place at the Scandinavian Masters. He failed to retain his place on the European Tour after 2013 and played on the Challenge Tour from 2014 to 2016 and the Alps Tour in 2017.

Amateur wins
2003 Mexico International Amateur Championship

Professional wins
2008 Championship de Barbaroux

Results in major championships

Note: Gonnet only played in The Open Championship.
"T" = tied

Team appearances
Amateur
European Amateur Team Championship (representing France): 2003

See also
2006 Challenge Tour graduates
2009 European Tour Qualifying School graduates
2019 European Tour Qualifying School graduates

References

External links

French male golfers
European Tour golfers
Sportspeople from Cannes
1982 births
Living people